This article details Car Nos. 10–13 of the Manx Electric Railway on the Isle of Man.

This was the third batch of motorcars delivered to the railway in 1895 at the same time as the cars for the new Snaefell Mountain Railway were delivery. They were constructed to a very similar design to those provided for the mountain line.  These vehicles were not a success owing to their initially open side with no glazed windows and were subsequently converted for use as cattle cars, one of which survives today, numbered 26 (in sequence with good stock rather than power cars, as power car 26 is still extant).  It is currently in store but was for several years part of a display at Ramsey Plaza station as part of a small museum.  It is the sole survivor of the class, the remaining ones were also converted to cattle cars but decreased usage of the railway for such use meant that they were surplus to requirements and only one was retained to ensure that one of each type is retained.

References

Sources
 Manx Manx Electric Railway Fleetlist (2002) Manx Electric Railway Society
 Island Island Images: Manx Electric Railway Pages (2003) Jon Wornham
 Official Official Tourist Department Page (2009) Isle Of Man Heritage Railways

Manx Electric Railway